Sub Zero Ice Rink was an ice rink, in Cleveleys, Lancashire, England. The rink was  x .

It was home to the Fylde Flyers, Blackpool Seagulls and Wyre Seagulls ice hockey teams.

History
Sub Zero Leisure secured the lease for the building in 2010 and began converting it into an ice rink. The rink opened in April 2011. The rink was home to the Fylde Coast Figure Skating Club.

Three ice hockey teams played at the ice rink. Fylde Flyers played in the English National Ice Hockey League, North Two Division. It was also home to two recreational teams, the re-formed Blackpool Seagulls and Wyre Seagulls.

The lease was not renewed by the building owner, forcing the original investor out. A new leaseholder began running the rink as 'Jubilee Ice Arena' in September 2013. With negative media coverage of the circumstances surrounding the takeover, as well as the opening of another ice rink in nearby Bispham, the business closed again in September 2014. A community interest company was formed to try to keep it open but that too finished and the rink closed for good in October 2015, going into liquidation in 2016. The premises briefly opened as a family entertainment centre  and is currently a gym.

Note; If the dimensions quoted above are correct it was a very small rink, since the American (or Imperial) size for a hockey rink is 85 x 185 ft and a full (or Olympic) size rink is 30M x 60M (about 100 ft x 200 ft).

References

External links
Sub Zero website
Fylde Coast Figure Skating Club website

Indoor ice hockey venues in England
Sports venues in Lancashire